María Edwards de Errázuriz (née María Edwards McClure or María Errázuriz; 11 December 1893 – 8 June 1972) was a Chilean social worker and Catholic nurse who was honored in November 2005 at Israel's Yad Vashem memorial (the Holocaust Martyrs' and Heroes' Remembrance Authority) as one of the "Righteous Among The Nations," for her participation during the Holocaust in helping to save Jewish children in France. Her actions were not limited to saving Jews but she also actively helped the French resistance.

Life and career
María Edwards was born in Santiago, the daughter of Agustín Edwards Ross and of María Luisa McClure Ossandón. While still quite young, she married Guillermo Errázuriz Vergara, and they moved to Paris, where he was to take up his diplomatic post. Errázuriz killed himself in 1922, leaving her a widow; they had one daughter together, María Angélica Errázuriz, who was born in England. After his death, she decided to remain in France. In 1926, she married her second husband, the French writer Jacques Feydeau, though they subsequently divorced soon afterwards. She was a lifelong devout Catholic.

During the German occupation of Paris, she worked as a volunteer nurse at the Hôpital Rothschild. While working there, she joined the French Resistance, and helped, many times by risking her own life, to rescue Jewish children who had been separated from their parents and were sentenced to be sent to the concentration camps to be eliminated. She was arrested, interrogated and tortured several times by the Gestapo, but was able to escape death thanks to her background and diplomatic relations.

On September 2, 1953, María Edwards was awarded the Legion d'Honneur for bravery in France. She returned to Chile permanently to retire from public life in 1960 and died there in 1972.

Additional information

See also
Agustín Edwards Mac Clure
Edwards family

Notes

External links
 María Edwards at Yad Vashem website

1893 births
1972 deaths
M
Chilean people of World War II
Chilean Righteous Among the Nations
Catholic Righteous Among the Nations
Recipients of the Legion of Honour
People from Santiago
People who rescued Jews during the Holocaust
20th-century Chilean women
Chilean Roman Catholics
Chilean people of Welsh descent
Chilean people of Scottish descent
Women in World War II
French Resistance members
Female anti-fascists